The Powell River-class ferry is a class of ships formerly operated by BC Ferries. The open deck vessels were mostly used on low-to-moderate volume routes, with Mayne Queen having operated permanently on Route 5, connecting the Outer Gulf Islands with Swartz Bay, Powell River Queen having served on Route 23, Campbell River to Quadra Island, and Bowen Queen having been on relief duty, typically filling in on Routes 4, 5, and 9.

 Differences between vessels 
There are some distinctions between vessels, most obviously the different profile of Powell River Queen- instead of having two passenger lounges on Deck Three and a centre lane for taller traffic like her sisters, Powell River Queen has all that space for overheight vehicles, resulting in the different look. Mayne Queen is the only one to have ever had side loading capabilities, for use at a pier as opposed to strictly BC Ferries terminals. These were fitted at the time of manufacture, and remained until a $9 million overhaul of the entire class in 1979 when along with being stretched and re-engined, she had her side ramp capability removed.  It is still possible to see the depression in the side of the deck where the ramp once was, just behind the painted propeller warning on opposing corners of the vessel. Bowen Queen had a staffed snack bar, whereas Mayne Queen had hers removed, in favour of vending machines.

 Technical details MV Bowen Queen
 Built: Victoria, British Columbia, 1965
 Length: 84.96 m (278'9")
 Power: 3,600
 Service speed: 14 knots
 Gross tons: 1,475.68
 Car capacity: 70
 Passenger & crew capacity: 400
 Retirement: March 27, 2022
MV Mayne Queen
 Built: Victoria, British Columbia, 1965
 Length: 84.96 m (278'9")
 Power: 3,600
 Service speed: 14 knots
 Gross tons: 1,475.68
 Car capacity: 58
 Passenger & crew capacity: 400
 Retirement: November 20, 2022
 Route: Swartz Bay ↔ Outer Gulf Islands
MV Powell River Queen
 Built: Victoria, British Columbia, 1965
 Length: 84.96 m (278'9")
 Power: 3,598
 Service speed: 14 knots
 Gross tons: 1,486
 Car capacity: 59
 Passenger & crew capacity: 400
 Retirement: January 17, 2023
 Route: Campbell River ↔ Quadra Island

See also
 List of ships in British Columbia

References

External links
 MV Bowen Queen
 MV Mayne Queen
 MV Powell River Queen
 
 
 

 
Ferry classes
1965 ships